Artur Fyodorov (born 3 January 1971) is a Kazakhstani wrestler. He competed in the men's freestyle 57 kg at the 1996 Summer Olympics.

References

1971 births
Living people
Kazakhstani male sport wrestlers
Olympic wrestlers of Kazakhstan
Wrestlers at the 1996 Summer Olympics
Place of birth missing (living people)
20th-century Kazakhstani people